Crime in the Kennel is the 133rd book in the Hardy Boys Mystery Stories series, written by Franklin W. Dixon.

Plot summary 
Iola's dog Spike is kidnapped, and the Hardy Boys set out to find him.

The Hardy Boys books
1995 American novels
1995 children's books
Children's novels about animals
Aladdin Paperbacks books